Frailea gracillima is a species of Frailea from Brazil, Paraguay, and Uruguay.

References

External links
 
 

gracillima